The Tacony–Palmyra Bridge is a combination steel tied-arch and double-leaf bascule bridge across the Delaware River that connects New Jersey Route 73 in Palmyra, New Jersey with Pennsylvania Route 73 in the Tacony section of Philadelphia. After one and a half years of construction, it opened on August 14, 1929, replacing ferry service that had operated between Tacony and Palmyra since May 6, 1922.

Owned and maintained by the Burlington County Bridge Commission of New Jersey, the bridge has a $4 cash toll and $3 E-ZPass toll for northbound (Pennsylvania-bound) traffic. Despite interruptions due to occasional openings for passing shipping traffic (the upper Delaware River is navigable as far north as Van Sciver Lake near Bristol, Pennsylvania), it serves as a lower-cost alternative to the more southerly, six-lane, high-span Betsy Ross Bridge, which charges $5 for the westbound crossing.

Built with four lanes, the bridge was modified in 1997 to have three wider lanestwo northbound towards Philadelphia and one southbound towards New Jersey. A walkway provides access for pedestrian and bicycle traffic.

The bascule draw span is located immediately east of the main, arched span. On October 10, 2013, the bascule span jammed and became stuck in the open position when a roller under the maintenance walkway seized, closing the bridge for approximately eleven hours. 

In 2016, work began on rehabilitation and improved traffic controls systems, including barriers and traffic lights.

See also
List of crossings of the Delaware River
 Tacony, Philadelphia
Palmyra, New Jersey

References

External links

Tacony-Palmyra Bridge, Burlington County Bridge Commission, New Jersey
 
Ehrhart, W.D., "Drawbridges on the Delaware", "Virginia Quarterly Review", Autumn 2002.

Bascule bridges in the United States
Toll bridges in New Jersey
Toll bridges in Pennsylvania
Bridges completed in 1929
Bridges over the Delaware River
Bridges in Burlington County, New Jersey
Bridges in Philadelphia
Road bridges in New Jersey
Road bridges in Pennsylvania
Tied arch bridges in the United States
Northeast Philadelphia
Palmyra, New Jersey
Steel bridges in the United States
Interstate vehicle bridges in the United States
1929 establishments in New Jersey
1929 establishments in Pennsylvania